Clive Christian No. 1 is an English fragrance that was introduced in 2001 by designer Clive Christian

It was marketed by parent company Crown Perfumery established in 1872. Clive Christian No. 1 was the most expensive perfume in the world as of 2006, costing $2,150 an ounce.

References

Perfumes